The Yankari shrew (Crocidura yankariensis) is a species of mammal in the family Soricidae. It is found in Cameroon, Central African Republic, Chad, Ethiopia, Kenya, Nigeria, Somalia, and Sudan. Its natural habitat is dry savanna.

References
 Hutterer, R. 2004.  Crocidura yankariensis.   2006 IUCN Red List of Threatened Species.   Downloaded on 30 July 2007.

Crocidura
Mammals described in 1980
Taxonomy articles created by Polbot